The Freiburg freight bypass railway is a line used only for freight transport to the west of Freiburg im Breisgau. The freight bypass railway allows freight trains to bypass the busy Freiburg Central Station (Hauptbahnhof) on a separate, direct line.

The freight bypass railway is classified as a main railway line and the whole line is double track and electrified with overhead wiring. It has the highest German track class of D4, which means that the line is built for axle loads of 22.5 tonnes and loads of 8.0 tonnes per metre of train.

The PZB 90 intermittent cab signalling system is used on the freight bypass railway. This contrasts with the parallel Rhine Valley Railway, which is protected by the LZB train protection system.

History
The Freiburg freight yard was built between 1901 and 1905 to overcome congestion at Freiburg station. The original location proposed was south of the main station on the Rhine Valley Railway, but because it provoked protests from the surrounding population, an undeveloped site west of central Freiburg was used instead.

Since this area was far from the existing railway facilities, it was connected by a new railway line, which is linked in the north and south of Freiburg with the Rhine Valley line. The new route could be built as a straight line, so it is a kilometre shorter than the old line via the central station.

The freight bypass railway was inaugurated on 4 September 1905.

Today's situation
As part of the new Karlsruhe–Basel high-speed railway, a new bypass of Freiburg is currently being planned for high-speed traffic to the west, broadly along the A 5 autobahn.

References

Footnotes

Sources

 

Railway lines in Baden-Württemberg
Railroad cutoffs
Transport in Freiburg im Breisgau
Standard gauge railways in Germany
Railway lines opened in 1905
Buildings and structures in Freiburg im Breisgau
1905 establishments in Germany